Tony Sympson (10 July 1906 – 30 March 1983) was a British actor.

Selected filmography
 The Indiscretions of Eve (1932) - Pip
 Sexton Blake and the Mademoiselle (1935) - Tinker
 Sexton Blake and the Bearded Doctor (1935) - Tinker
 Rhythm in the Air (1936) - Alf Higgins
 The Mutiny of the Elsinore (1937) - Shorty Peabody
 The Challenge (1938) - Luc Meynet
 Sexton Blake and the Hooded Terror (1938) - Tinker
 Night and the City (1950) - Cozen (uncredited)
 Street of Shadows (1953) - Nikki 
 Devil on Horseback (1954) - Musician
 Little Red Monkey (1955) - Cab Driver (uncredited)
 Dial 999 (1955) - Harry Briggs (uncredited)
 Keep It Clean (1956) - Little Tailor
 The Counterfeit Plan (1957) - Grune
 The Ghost Goes Gear (1966) - Lord Plumley
 Diamonds for Breakfast (film) (1968) - Anastasia's Manservant (uncredited)
 Lock Up Your Daughters! (1969) - Clerk of the Court
 Tiffany Jones (1973) - Prim Man
 House of Whipcord (1974) - Henry
 Eskimo Nell (1975) - Grandfather
 The Adventure of Sherlock Holmes' Smarter Brother (1975) - Opera Conductor
 The Pink Panther Strikes Again (1976) - Mr. Shork
 Jabberwocky (1977) - 3rd Peasant
 A Horse Called Jester (1979) - Ginger Wilkes
 Sir Henry at Rawlinson End (1980) - Old man

Selected television
 Barnaby Rudge (BBC, 1960) - Tom Cobb
 No Hiding Place (ITV, 1962) - Ned (The Skeleton Wore Boots)
 Ghost Squad (ITV, 1963) - The Fisherman (Mr Five Percent)
 Thursday Theatre (BBC, 1965) - Waiter (Anatol)
 Oh Brother! (BBC, 1970) - Cardinal
 Comedy Playhouse (BBC, 1970) - Thatcher (Haven of Rest)
 Bright's Boffins (BBC, 1970-1971) - Tiniest Guard (The Submarine), King Neptune/Customs Officer (The Smugglers), The Hon. Wiff Clarry (General Upheaval)
 Sykes (BBC, 1972-1973) - Landowner (Walk), (Bus), (Uniform)
 The Sweeney (ITV, 1975) - The Old Man (Night Out)
 Dawson's Weekly (ITV, 1975) - Call Boy (Stage-Struck)
 Are You Being Served? (BBC, 1976-1983) - Claude (Fifty Years On), Mr Webster (The Junior), Mr Wagstaff (Conduct Unbecoming)
 The Fall and Rise of Reginald Perrin (BBC, 1976) - Uncle Percy Spillinger (Episode 4)
 BBC2 Playhouse (BBC, 1976) - Mr Gee (The Mind Beyond: The Love of a Good Woman)
 All Creatures Great and Small (BBC, 1978) - Cliff Tyreman (The Beauty of the Beast)
 Oh Happy Band! (BBC, 1980) - Mr Giles
 The Shillingbury Blowers (1980) - Basil
 The Young Ones (BBC, 1982) - Old Man at DHSS (Bomb)
 Play for Today (BBC, 1983) - Owen (Shall I Be Mother?'')

References

External links

1906 births
1983 deaths
Male actors from London
British male film actors
British male television actors
20th-century British male actors